Pleurobranchella is a genus of sea slugs, marine gastropod mollusks in the family Pleurobranchaeidae.

Species
Species within the genus Pleurobranchella include:
 Pleurobranchella nicobarica Thiele, 1925
 Species brought into synonymy
 Pleurobranchella alba (Lin & Tchang, 1965): synonym of Pleurobranchella nicobarica Thiele, 1925
 Pleurobranchella gilchristi (O'Donoghue, 1929): synonym of Pleurobranchella nicobarica Thiele, 1925

References

 Dayrat B. (2001) Indo-Pacific deep-water Pleurobranchaeidae (Gastropoda: Opisthobranchia: Notaspidea): New records and new species. In: P. Bouchet & B.A. Marshall (eds) Tropical Deep-Sea Benthos volume 22. Mémoires du Muséum National d'Histoire Naturelle 185:321-330.

External links 
 A record of Pleurobranchella nicobarica Thiele, 1925 : (Pleurobranchomopha : Pleurobranchidae) from off Kume Island, Ryukyu Islands, Southwestern Japan

Pleurobranchaeidae